Thiosulfuric acid  is the inorganic compound with the formula . It has attracted academic interest as a simple, easily accessed compound that is labile. It has few practical uses.

Preparation and degradation
The acid cannot be made by acidifying aqueous thiosulfate salt solutions as the acid readily decomposes in water. The decomposition products can include sulfur, sulfur dioxide, hydrogen sulfide, polysulfanes, sulfuric acid and polythionates, depending on the reaction conditions. Anhydrous methods of producing the acid were developed by Max Schmidt:
 
 
 

The anhydrous acid also decomposes above −5 °C:

Structure

The isomer  is more stable than the isomer  as established by Hartree–Fock/ab initio calculations with a 6-311 G** basis set and MP2 to MP4 refinements. The theoretically predicted structure conforms with the double bond rule.

An isomer of thiosulfuric acid is the adduct of hydrogen sulfide and sulfur trioxide, which can also be prepared at low temperature. It is a white crystalline solid.

References

Hydrogen compounds
Sulfur oxoacids